Derecske is a district in central-eastern part of Hajdú-Bihar County. Derecske is also the name of the town where the district seat is found. The district is located in the Northern Great Plain Statistical Region.

Geography 
Derecske District borders with Debrecen District and Nyíradony District to the north, the Romanian county of Bihor to the east, Berettyóújfalu District to the south, Püspökladány District and Hajdúszoboszló District to the west. The number of the inhabited places in Derecske District is 13.

Municipalities 
The district has 2 towns, 2 large villages and 9 villages.
(ordered by population, as of 1 January 2012)

The bolded municipalities are cities, italics municipalities are large villages.

Demographics

In 2011, it had a population of 41,701 and the population density was 64/km2.

Ethnicity
Besides the Hungarian majority, the main minorities are the Roma (approx. 2,000) and Romanian (300).

Total population (2011 census): 41,701
Ethnic groups (2011 census): Identified themselves: 40,738 persons:
Hungarians: 37,464 (91.96%)
Gypsies: 2,657 (6.52%)
Others and indefinable: 617 (1.51%)
Approx. 2,000 persons in Derecske District did not declare their ethnic group at the 2011 census.

Religion
Religious adherence in the county according to 2011 census:

Reformed – 18,989;
Catholic – 5,410 (Roman Catholic – 2,872; Greek Catholic – 2,537);
other religions – 628; 
Non-religious – 8,603; 
Atheism – 235;
Undeclared – 7,836.

Gallery

See also
List of cities and towns of Hungary

References

External links
 Postal codes of the Derecske District

Districts in Hajdú-Bihar County